Brookwood School District 167 is an elementary school district based in the southern Cook County, Illinois village of Glenwood; it serves a periphery of the city of Chicago. The district is composed of two elementary schools, one middle school, and one junior high school; all schools are located within Glenwood. Students begin their education at either Hickory Bend Elementary School or Longwood Elementary School; both institutions serve students up to grade four, although Longwood includes a prekindergarten program. Students later attend Brookwood Middle School from fifth through sixth grade before completing their education in the district at Brookwood Junior High School, which serves grades seven and eight. The district's superintendent is Dr. Valorie Moore.

References

External links
 

School districts in Cook County, Illinois